is a Japanese professional golfer.

Uehara started playing golf at age 12, turned professional in 2003, and made her way onto the LPGA Tour on her first attempt. Together with Ai Miyazato and Sakura Yokomine, she was a member of the Japanese team that won a silver medal at the 2002 Asian Games.

In 2016, Uehara made two holes-in-one during the Canadian Pacific Women's Open, tying the LPGA record for most holes-in-one in a single tournament. In November the same year, she set another record when she posted a score of 141 during round one of the Ito En Ladies Golf Tournament on the LPGA of Japan Tour. Uehara mistakenly applied the local rule of "lift, clean, and place" (common on the LPGA) when it should have been "lift, clean, and replace", earning her 68 penalties, two for each of the 19 violations and one for each of the 15 holes with an incorrect score on her scorecard.

Uehara, in solo second place just one shot off of the lead, played in the final group at a major championship for the first time in her career at the 2017 Evian Championship.

Professional wins (3)

LPGA of Japan Tour wins (3)

Results in LPGA majors
Results not in chronological order before 2019.

CUT = missed the half-way cut
NT = no tournament
T = tied

Summary

Most consecutive cuts made – 5 (2013 Kraft Nabisco – 2013 Evian)
Longest streak of top-10s – 2 (2017 Evian – 2018 ANA)

Team appearances
Amateur
Asian Games (representing Japan): 2002

Professional
Lexus Cup (representing Asia team): 2007 (winners)
International Crown (representing Japan): 2018

References

External links

Japanese female golfers
LPGA of Japan Tour golfers
LPGA Tour golfers
Asian Games medalists in golf
Asian Games silver medalists for Japan
Golfers at the 2002 Asian Games
Medalists at the 2002 Asian Games
Sportspeople from Okinawa Prefecture
People from Naha
1983 births
Living people
21st-century Japanese women